David Denne (1799 – 3 December 1861) was an English first-class cricketer associated with Kent who was active in the 1820s. He is recorded in two matches in 1823, totalling 10 runs with a highest score of 6. His brother Thomas and his son Lambert also appeared in cricket matches that have since been adjudged first-class.

He was also Deputy Lieutenant and Justice of the Peace for the County of Kent, and formerly Captain of the East Kent and Cinque Ports Yeomanry, and Bailiff of the town Corporation 23 times.

References

English cricketers
English cricketers of 1787 to 1825
Kent cricketers
1799 births
1861 deaths